Broekhuizen may refer to:
 Broekhuizen, Limburg in Horst aan de Maas
 , a hamlet near Meppel
 , a hamlet near Gouda
 , a hamlet near Dalfsen
Broekhuizen (surname), a Dutch toponymic surname referring to one of the above